The fifth season of the American television series Leave It to Beaver aired from September 30, 1961 to June 30, 1962 on ABC. It consisted of 39 black-and-white episodes, each running approximately 25 minutes.

Production 

The fifth season of Leave It to Beaver debuted on ABC September 30, 1961 with "Wally Goes Steady" and aired its last episode, "Un-togetherness", June 30, 1962. Like the previous four seasons, the fifth season consists of 39 black-and-white, full-screen, half-hour episodes (with ads) shot on 35mm film.

Opening and closing sequences
The opening sequence, as in the fourth season, shows the front entrance of the house at 211 Pine St. This time, when the door opens, June appears carrying a tray that holds a full, chilled pitcher and four glasses, as the announcer intones, "starring Barbara Billingsley". June turns to her right and beckons to Ward, whom we see pruning shrubbery with hedge clippers, then to her left, where Wally looks up from his lawn mower near some shrubbery, then toward the walkway, where Beaver looks up happily from mowing, all as the stars are announced. After an introductory scene, some credits for writing and directing are given. The closing sequence is similar to that of the third and fourth seasons, except that guest star credits link the actors to their roles.

Casting
All four cast members appear in every episode. This season marks the last appearance of Burt Mustin as Gus the fireman and Sue Randall as Ms. Landers.

Direction and Writing
Norman Abbott directs most of the episodes of the season with Hugh Beaumont directing some episodes too.

Leave it to Beaver Universe
In this season, Beaver is in sixth grade at Grant Ave. Grammar School and Wally is in twelfth grade at Mayfield High. This is the first season where Beaver has a deep voice and is somewhat awkward.

Episodes

References
 Applebaum, Irwyn. The World According to Beaver. TV Books, 1998. .
 IMDb: Leave It to Beaver. Season 5.
 Mathers, Jerry....And Jerry Mathers as "The Beaver". Berkley Boulevard Books, 1998. .

5